Shoojit Sircar (born ) is an Indian filmmaker, director and producer known for his work in Hindi films. He has received several awards, including two National Film Awards and a Filmfare Award from five nominations.

Sircar made his directorial debut with the romantic war drama Yahaan (2005). He rose to prominence in Hindi cinema with the critically and commercially successful romantic comedy Vicky Donor (2012) for which he received the National Film Award for Best Popular Film Providing Wholesome Entertainment. He followed it a year later by directing the political action thriller Madras Cafe (2013).

His next film, Piku (2015), received critical acclaim upon release and emerged as a box office success, earned him several Best Director Awards and Best Film Awards and winning him the Best Film (Critics) at the Filmfare Awards. His home production, the legal thriller Pink, won the Best Film on Other Social Issues in 2016. Sircar subsequently directed and produced the coming-of-age drama October (2018) and the Amazon Prime Video's comedy Gulabo Sitabo (2020). The latter earned him another Filmfare Award for Best Director nomination. Sircar's prominence increased in 2021 with the biographical historical drama Sardar Udham which received widespread critical acclaim. He is also the co-founder of the film production company Rising Sun Films.

Early and personal life 
Sircar was born into a Bengali family in Barrackpore, Kolkata in the Indian state of West Bengal. He completed his schooling from Kendriya Vidyalaya Barrackpore Airforce in 1985 and graduated with a Bachelor of Commerce from Shaheed Bhagat Singh College at the University of Delhi. Sircar lost both his parents in 2004; his father passed away due to cancer and his mother from a brain stroke.

In his early years, he worked as an accountant at Le Meridien hotel in Delhi as well advertisement industry. He aspired for a career in films after attending the International Film Festival of India in Delhi. He credits the American documentary film Dear America: Letters Home from Vietnam and Satyajit Ray’s Pather Panchali as the two films that inspired him to start a career in cinema. In the early 1990s, Sircar formed a theatre group named Act One, which had as troupe members Manoj Bajpayee, Piyush Mishra and Ashish Vidyarthi.

Sircar is married to Jhuma Sircar, and a parent to two daughters, Koyna and Anannya Sircar. He lives with his family in Kolkata. Sircar is also a football enthusiast and is part of the All Stars Football Club, a celebrity football club that raises money for charity.

Career

Early work (2005–2012) 
Sircar made his directorial debut in 2005 with Yahaan. The romantic war drama featured Jimmy Sheirgill, Minissha Lamba in a love story set in war-savaged Kashmir. It was met with mixed critical reception and poor box office revenues upon release. His second film, titled Shoebite, starring Amitabh Bachchan remains unreleased as of 2018 due to a copyright legal battle between Percept Picture Company and UTV Motion Pictures. The debacle related to Shoebite led Sircar to establish his own film production company in 2007 with Ronnie Lahiri, naming it Rising Sun Films, under which all of his directorial films would be made. Sircar's first home production was the Bengali-language drama film Aparajita Tumi which was directed by Aniruddha Roy Chowdhury.

Vicky Donor and rise to prominence (2012–2020) 

Sircar rose to prominence in 2012 with the critically and commercially successful romantic comedy Vicky Donor. It marked the Hindi film debut of Ayushmann Khurrana and Yami Gautam. The film which was set against the background of sperm donation and infertility within a Bengali-Punjabi household grossed 66.32 crore worldwide, against a budget of 15 crore. It won the National Film Award for Best Popular Film Providing Wholesome Entertainment at the 60th National Film Awards. Sircar stated that he made the film because he wanted to explore "a light-hearted look at the taboo attached to infertility and artificial insemination." Before filming began, he researched the plot themes for over three years. The film was remade in Telugu as Naruda Donoruda (2016) and in Tamil as Dharala Prabhu (2020).

He followed it up a year later with the political action thriller Madras Cafe starring John Abraham and Nargis Fakhri with newcomer Raashi Khanna in lead roles. Set during the time of Indian intervention in the Sri Lankan civil war and assassination of Indian prime minister Rajiv Gandhi, it received positive critical reception upon release. Rajeev Masand of CNN-IBN noted that "Unlike, in the West, it's hard to make films on real-life historical events in India. Political pressures and sensitive groups invariably throw a spanner in the works. Which is why it's commendable what director Shoojit Sircar has undertaken with Madras Café."

In 2015, Sircar directed and produced Piku. Starring Deepika Padukone as the titular protagonist, Amitabh Bachchan and Irrfan Khan, the film is loosely based on the 1980 Bengali-language short film Pikoo by Satyajit Ray. It garnered widespread critical acclaim upon release and emerged as a commercial success. The film was nominated for Best Film, Best Director and Best Film (Critics) at the 61st Filmfare Awards. The same year, Sircar produced the Bengali language film Open Tee Bioscope. His next home production was Pink (2016), a Hindi-language legal thriller featuring an ensemble cast including Taapsee Pannu, Kirti Kulhari, Andrea Tariang and Amitabh Bachchan. Sircar also wrote the story of the film. It received widespread critical acclaim and emerged as a surprising commercial success. At 64th National Film Awards, Pink won the category of Best Film on Other Social Issues.

Sircar's next was the coming-of-age drama October (2018), which follows the life of a hotel-management intern (played by Varun Dhawan) who takes care of his comatose fellow intern (Banita Sandhu) in an unconditional and unconventional manner. Upon its release, the filmmakers were accused of plagiarising Aarti – The Unknown Love Story, a Marathi film directed by Sarika Mene. Screenwriters Association reviewed the case and found some similarities between the two films. However, it was eventually cleared of all charges. October received positive reviews and was a modest commercial success. Sircar then reunited with Bachchan and Khurrana in the 2020 comedy-drama Gulabo Sitabo. Due to the COVID-19 pandemic, the film was one of the first Bollywood films to be released directly on Amazon Prime Video worldwide. It received thirteen nominations at the 66th Filmfare Awards including Best Film, Best Film (Critics) and Best Director.

Sardar Udham and beyond (2021–present)

Sircar's prominence increased in 2021 with the biographical historical drama Sardar Udham starring Vicky Kaushal in the titular role. Based on the life of Udham Singh, a freedom fighter from Punjab who assassinated Michael O'Dwyer in London to avenge the 1919 Jallianwala Bagh massacre in Amritsar, the film had a direct-to-digital premiere through Amazon Prime Video during the Dusshera weekend.  Shoojit wanted to make a film of the life of Udham Singh during his college days, and planned to produce it in his mid-1990s, but the research work on the freedom fighter took him two long decades. Sardar Udham eventually received widespread critical acclaim. Saibal Chatterjee of NDTV stated "There is a phenomenal degree of craft in Sardar Udham but none of it is employed for mere effect. There is great deal of soul, too, in this magnificently crafted film." Sardar Udham was listed by several publications as the best Bollywood film of the year.

Filmography

Accolades

References

External links 

 

21st-century Indian film directors
Film producers from Kolkata
Bengali Hindus
Living people
Hindi-language film directors
Bengali film directors
Television commercial directors
Kendriya Vidyalaya alumni
Bengali film producers
Film directors from Kolkata
Directors who won the Best Popular Film Providing Wholesome Entertainment National Film Award
Screen Awards winners
1960s births